The Rayner Pusher is a homebuilt version of the Curtiss Pusher.

Design and development
The Rayner Pusher is a single-seat, tricycle landing gear-equipped biplane with a pusher engine layout. The fuselage is welded steel tubing. The wings are fabric covered on top surfaces only. It uses a fuel tank mounted above the top wing.

Specifications

See also

References

Homebuilt aircraft